Desmella anceps is a species of tephritid or fruit flies in the genus Desmella of the family Tephritidae.

Distribution
Morocco.

References

Tephritinae
Insects described in 1861
Diptera of Africa